Taylor White is a Guyanese footballer who plays as a goalkeeper for the Guyana women's national team.

Club career
White has played youth soccer for Oshawa Kicks in Canada.

International career
White capped for Guyana at senior level during the 2018 CONCACAF Women's Championship qualification.

See also
List of Guyana women's international footballers

References

Living people
Guyanese women's footballers
Women's association football goalkeepers
Guyana women's international footballers
Guyanese expatriate footballers
Guyanese expatriate sportspeople in Canada
Expatriate women's soccer players in Canada
Year of birth missing (living people)